Sudhagad - Pali taluka is a taluka in Raigad district of Maharashtra an Indian state.

Raigad district
As of August 2015, there were 8 sub-divisions, 15 talukas, 1970 villages, 60 revenue circles and 350 sazzas in Raigad district. The talukas being Alibag, Karjat, Khalapur, Mahad, Mangaon, Mhasala, Murud, Panvel, Pen, Poladpur, Roha, Shrivardhan, Sudhagad - Pali, Tala and Uran.

References

Talukas in Maharashtra
Talukas in Raigad district